This is a list of titles for the Atari Jaguar and its CD add-on developed and released by independent developers and publishers. Many of the games present here have been released long after the end of the console's official life span in 1996, with the last officially licensed title released in 1998. Consequently, these homebrew games are not endorsed or licensed by Atari. After the properties of Atari Corporation were bought out by Hasbro Interactive in 1998, the rights and patents to the Jaguar were released into the public domain in 1999, declaring the console an open platform and opening the doors for homebrew development. Thanks to this, a few developers and publishers such as AtariAge, B&C Computervisions, Piko Interactive, Songbird Productions and Video61 continue to release previously unfinished games from the Jaguar's past life cycle, as well as new titles, to satisfy the system's cult following as of date.

Homebrew games for the Atari Jaguar are released in either cartridge, CD or both formats to satisfy system owners. Titles released in the CD format are either glass mastered, or burned on regular CD-Rs however, since the add-on was released in very limited quantities, most homebrew developers publish their works either online on forums or on cartridge via independent publishers. Many of the cartridge releases are styled as retail Jaguar titles from the era. As both systems do not enforce regional locking all  titles are region free but some titles, such as Gorf Classic and the initial release of Black Out! do not work correctly on PAL systems. Some of the earliest CD releases were not encrypted, requiring either B&C's Jaguar CD Bypass Cartridge or Reboot's Jagtopia (Freeboot) program burned into a CD in order to run unencrypted CD games, however Curt Vendel of Atari Museum released the binaries and encryption keys for both cartridge and CD formats, making it possible to run games without the need for development hardware. The first homebrew title programmed for the Jaguar dates back to 1995, which was a Jaguar version of Tetris called JSTetris (often referred as Jaguar Tetris or JagTris) developed using a hacked Jaguar (BJL, ROM replaced by custom software).

The following list includes all of the post-release titles as of 2018, as well as homebrew games and demos made by the community. There has been an increase in the number of homebrew games being released for the Jaguar in recent years, which started in 2016 and 2017 saw the highest number of new titles released for the system since 1998.

Post-release homebrew games

Homebrew games and demos
These are small games and demos made by multiple members and groups of the Jaguar homebrew community:

 Atari_Owl
 The Owl Project

 BadCoder
 BadCode0
 BadCode1
 BadCode2
 BadCode3
 BadCode4
 BadCode4 C
 BadCode4 (Metal)
 BadCode4 (New Metal)

 Bastian "42bs" Schick
 JSTetris (1995)
 Mandelbrot Demo (1997)

 Bitjag
 Portland Retro Gaming Expo 2014 Welcome Demo

 Cedric "Orion" Bourse
 Diamjag
 Jungle Jag 
 Lines
 Osmozys
 Retro-Gaming Connexion 2006 (demo)
 Sprite

 Checkpoint
 Embrace The Plasma (demo)
 j_ (demo)
 Morphonic Lab XIII: Contarum (demo)
 Sillyventure 2013 Invitation (demo)

 Christopher "Ninjabba" Vick
 The Maxx (demo)

 Chris "JagChris/A31Chris" Contreras
 Bomber Vs. Fighter

 Chris "atari2600land" Read
 Ants
 Stickman

 Clint "Mindthreat" Thompson
 Aurora64 Screen Saver (demo)
 The CAR Demo
 Dragonox (demo)
 Fish Fest Fury
 Jaguar Jukebox
 Midsummer Dreams
 S1M0N3
 Space Defense: Project 1196

 DrTypo
 Fallen Angels
 Fallen Angels Demo
 GemRace
 Shoot'em Up
 Tube
 Tube Second Edition
 Voxel Engine (demo)

 David "GT Turbo" Brylka
 Project Apocalypse

 Fadest
 Black Hole
 Dazed VS
 Project W
 S.P.A.C.E.

 Force Design
 Black Jag: Hyper Power League (demo)
 Legion Force Jidai: The Next Era! (demo)

 Fréderic "FrediFredo" Moreau
 Jaguar Hockey Legends '13
 The Wolfenite Mine

 Graeme "LinkoVitch" Hinchliffe
 Reactris

 Holger Hannig
 JagCube (demo)
 JagPattern (demo)

 JagNes
 JagNes Invitation (demo)

 James "edarkness1" Garvin
 The Assassin (demo)
 Dark Guardian Episode 1: Unknown Enemy (demo)

 Jason "Zetanyx/MegaData" Data
 Native Spirit

 Jeff "rush6432" Nihlean
 Arkanna (demo)
 Pong
 Zero (demo)

 Kevin "sh3-rg" Dempsey
 Bexagon
 Blue KNIGHT\White Horse
 Boingy Uppy
 μFLY

 Lars "Starcat" Hieronymus
 Eerievale (demo)
 EJagfest 2000 (demo)
 HalMock FurBall - Sink or Swim
 Jaguar Development Club #1 (demo)
 Jaguar Development Club #2 (demo)
 JaguarMIND: Bomb Squad
 JagWorm
 Juiced
 Lost Treasures
 Ocean Depths
 Starcat Developments Demo

 Mark "GroovyBee" Ball
 Duckie Egg
 Mars Rover (demo)
 Moles
 Star Raiders (ST-to-Jaguar port)

 Matthieu "Matmook" Barreteau
 Dance Dance Xirius Space Party
 Do The Same
 Ladybugged
 The Quest

 Matthias "mdgames" Domin
 Balloon
 Clicks!
 Colors (demo)
 ColMouse
 JagMania
 JagMarble

 Mike "Tursi" Brent
 JagLion
 JagRotate
 Martian Attack

 OMF
 Kaboom

 Reboot
 Beebris
 Bad Apple (demo)
 Cloudy With A Chance Of Meatballs (demo)
 Degz
 Doger (demo)
 Downfall
 Expressway
 Full Circle: Rocketeer Promo
 Half Circle 8bitter
 HMS Raptor
 Kobayashi Maru
 Particle Playtime (demo)
 Project One
 Project Two
 Rocks Off!
 SuperFly DX
 Shit's Frozen 64 (demo)
 Tripper Getem (demo)
 Wiggle (demo)

 Robert Jurziga
 Drumpad
 Drumpad 2
 Hubble Fade
 Hubble Nebula
 JSS Demo
 JSS Demo 2
 PAULA Preview Demo
 PAULA Preview Demo 2

 Sébastien "SebRmv" Briais
 Atomic

 Sebastian Mihai
 Jagmatch

 Steven "GORF" Scavone
 UFO (demo)
 Surrounded!

 Swapd0
 Frontier: Elite II (ST-to-Jaguar port)

 Toarnold
 2048
 Gryzzles

 Vladimir "VladR" Repisky
 H.E.R.O. (demo)
 Klax3D
 S.T.U.N. Runner (demo)

See also
 List of Atari Jaguar games
 List of cancelled Atari Jaguar games
 Lists of video games

References

Homebrew software
Video game development
Atari Jaguar